Herrlein is a German surname. Notable people with the surname include:

Friedrich Herrlein (1889–1974), German general
Jürgen Herrlein (born 1962), German lawyer and historian

German-language surnames